Johannes Taslim (born 23 June 1981) is an Indonesian actor and martial artist. He was a member of Indonesia's judo national team from 1997 to 2009. He is known for his roles as Sergeant Jaka in The Raid (2011), Jah in Fast & Furious 6 (2013), Star Trek Beyond (2016), as Li Yong in Warrior and as Sub-Zero in Mortal Kombat (2021).

Early life
Taslim was born in Palembang, Indonesia. He is of Chinese descent.

Film career
Taslim is active as a model and actor, appearing in magazines, TV commercials and several Indonesian feature films. 

Taslim retired from judo in his late 20s to pursue acting.

In 2010, he won the role of Jaka, a sergeant in a special police squad, in the award-winning The Raid, after a series of fight auditions and reading. 

Following The Raid, Taslim took part in HBO Asia's first action horror film, Dead Mine, which had a theatrical release in selected Asian territories in September 2012, followed by exclusive television premieres across the HBO Asia network.

Taslim appeared in the feature film Fast & Furious 6 (2013), as the villainous Jah, a mercenary who uses his martial arts to fight two of the film's protagonists, Roman Pearce (Tyrese Gibson) and Han Seoul-Oh (Sung Kang).

In May 2013, it was reported that Taslim would star in the action thriller The Night Comes for Us. In September 2014, pre-production on the film was halted and the script was instead adapted as a graphic novel. The film was eventually released by Netflix on 19 October 2018.

In 2016, he played an antagonist character, Manas, a former first officer of Captain Balthazar Edison (played by Idris Elba), Anderson Le, turned into an alien in Star Trek Beyond.

In 2017, Taslim was cast in the role of Li Yong in the Cinemax action series, Warrior. He played Li Yong, a Long Zii enforcer and secretly Mai Ling's lover. His character serves as a rival to the series' protagonist Ah Sahm. The series premiered on 5 April 2019. 

In July 2019, Taslim was cast as Sub-Zero in the Mortal Kombat reboot. The film premiered in April 2021 in theaters and on HBO Max.

Filmography

Film

Television

Sport achievements

Awards and nominations

References

External links
 
 
 
 

1981 births
21st-century Indonesian male actors
Indonesian male film actors
Indonesian male judoka
Indonesian male models
Indonesian male taekwondo practitioners
Indonesian male television actors
Indonesian people of Chinese descent
Indonesian Protestants
Living people
People from Palembang
Silat practitioners
Indonesian Christians
Southeast Asian Games medalists in judo
Southeast Asian Games silver medalists for Indonesia
Southeast Asian Games bronze medalists for Indonesia
Competitors at the 2007 Southeast Asian Games